You Can Be Special Too is the debut album of Evil Nine. It was released on 2 August 2004 on Marine Parade Records.

The album includes four skits containing a variety of samples.

Tracks 12 and 13 are mislabeled on the album. The song "Restless" actually plays on track 13 and "Even the Smells" plays on track 12. It is unknown what order the tracks were meant to appear on the album. The correct times are listed below according to the track name - but not the number.

Track listing
 "Crooked" (featuring Aesop Rock) – 5:47
 "Devil Stuff" – 4:52
 "Earth" – 4:38
 "You Can Be Special (Skit)" – 0:34
 "We Have the Energy" – 5:21
 "Snack Bar Lounge" – 2:55
 "Help (Skit)" – 0:22
 "Pearl Shot" (featuring Juice Aleem) – 5:19
 "You Are Not Through" – 4:48
 "Richard & Jane (Skit)" – 0:30
 "For Lovers Not Fighters" – 4:12
 "Even the Smells" – 2:03
 "Restless" (featuring Toastie Taylor) – 4:54
 "You Can Be Special 2 (Skit)" – 0:31
 "Hired Goons" – 5:44

Samples
The dialogue at the start of track 4 is from the book Do Androids Dream of Electric Sheep?.

Personnel

Evil Nine
 Tom Beaufoy - keyboards, turntables, programming, samples
 Patrick Pardy - bass, guitar, engineering, keyboards

Additional musicians
 Chris Kavanagh (Big Audio Dynamite) - drums
 Aesop Rock - raps on "Crooked"
 Juice Aleem - raps on "Pearl Shot"
 Mary Shodipo - vocals on "You Are Not Through"
 Grant Mitchell - guitar on "Devil Stuff" & "You Are Not Through"
 Garvin Edwards (Toastie Taylor) - raps and vocals on "Restless"

References

2004 debut albums
Evil Nine albums